The 26° Rally Argentina, the sixth round of the 2006 World Rally Championship season took place between April 27 and April 30, 2006.

Results

Special Stages
All dates and times are ART (UTC-3).

External links
 Results at eWRC.com
 Results at Jonkka's World Rally Archive

Argentina
Rally Argentina
Rally